The 39th National Film Awards, presented by Directorate of Film Festivals, the organisation set up by Ministry of Information and Broadcasting, India to felicitate the best of Indian Cinema released in the year 1991. Ceremony took place in 1992.

With 39th National Film Awards, two new awards were introduced for feature films section. These awards includes National Film Award for Best Special Effects and National Film Award for Best Choreography and awarded with Rajat Kamal (Silver Lotus). These two newly introduced awards were not given for 39th National Film Awards as no film/entry was found to be suitable.

Also for Best Writing on Cinema, Best Film Critic is awarded with Swarna Kamal (Golden Lotus), which was till then awarded with Rajat Kamal (Silver Lotus).

Awards 

Awards were divided into feature films, non-feature films and books written on Indian cinema.

Lifetime Achievement Award

Feature films 

Feature films were awarded at All India as well as regional level. For 39th National Film Awards, a Bengali film, Agantuk won the National Film Award for Best Feature Film also winning the maximum number of awards (3) along with a Malayalam film, Bharatham and a Hindi film, Dharavi. Following were the awards given in each category:

Juries 

A committee headed by Adoor Gopalakrishnan was appointed to evaluate the feature films awards. Following were the jury members:

 Jury Members
 Adoor Gopalakrishnan (Chairperson)Aamir Raza HusainAshish SarafFirooze RangoonwalaGummadiHema ChaudharyR. LakshmanLalitha RaveeNabyendu ChatterjeeNityananda SamntarayP. MadhavanPrafulla SaikiaP. R. S. PillayRaja MitraSreekumaran ThampiUrvashi TalwarVinod Nagpal

All India Award 

Following were the awards given:

Golden Lotus Award 

Official Name: Swarna Kamal

All the awardees are awarded with 'Golden Lotus Award (Swarna Kamal)', a certificate and cash prize.

Silver Lotus Award 

Official Name: Rajat Kamal

All the awardees are awarded with 'Silver Lotus Award (Rajat Kamal)', a certificate and cash prize.

Regional Awards 

The award is given to best film in the regional languages in India.

Non-Feature Films 

Short Films made in any Indian language and certified by the Central Board of Film Certification as a documentary/newsreel/fiction are eligible for non-feature film section.

Juries 

A committee headed by Buddhadeb Dasgupta was appointed to evaluate the non-feature films awards. Following were the jury members:

 Jury Members
 Buddhadeb Dasgupta (Chairperson)Arun KaulJag MohanJehangir ChaudharyVijaya Mulay

Golden Lotus Award 

Official Name: Swarna Kamal

All the awardees are awarded with 'Golden Lotus Award (Swarna Kamal)', a certificate and cash prize.

Silver Lotus Award 

Official Name: Rajat Kamal

All the awardees are awarded with 'Silver Lotus Award (Rajat Kamal)' and cash prize.

Best Writing on Cinema 

The awards aim at encouraging study and appreciation of cinema as an art form and dissemination of information and critical appreciation of this art-form through publication of books, articles, reviews etc.

Juries 

A committee headed by Kamleshwar was appointed to evaluate the writing on Indian cinema. Following were the jury members:

 Jury Members
 Kamleshwar (Chairperson)Shanta Sarbjeet SinghVijay Sasnur

Golden Lotus Award 
Official Name: Swarna Kamal

All the awardees are awarded with 'Golden Lotus Award (Swarna Kamal)' and cash prize.

Awards not given 

Following were the awards not given as no film was found to be suitable for the award:

 Best Popular Film Providing Wholesome Entertainment
 Best Film on Environment Conservation/Preservation
 Best Feature Film in Manipuri
 Best Feature Film in Marathi
 Best Feature Film in Punjabi
 Best Feature Film in English
 Best Non-Feature Film Direction
 Best Exploration / Adventure Film

References

External links 
 National Film Awards Archives
 Official Page for Directorate of Film Festivals, India

National Film Awards (India) ceremonies
1991 Indian film awards